Szilard is a damaged lunar impact crater that lies to the east-northeast of the crater Richardson. It is named after Leó Szilárd, the scientist who theorised nuclear chain reactions and famously worked on the atomic bomb during World War II.  About a half-crater-diameter to the northwest is the large walled plain Harkhebi. Between Harkhebi and Szilard is the small Giordano Bruno. The ray system from this impact forms streaks across the rim and interior of Szilard.

The rim of Szilard is heavily eroded and has been reshaped by subsequent impacts. The worn satellite crater Szilard H lies across the southeast rim of Szilard. The interior floor of Szilard is somewhat uneven in the western half, while the eastern side is more level and featureless.

Szilard lies on the far side of the Moon and cannot be seen directly from the Earth.

Prior to formal naming in 1970 by the IAU, this crater was known as Crater 116.

Satellite craters
By convention these features are identified on lunar maps by placing the letter on the side of the crater midpoint that is closest to Szilard.

References

 
 
 
 
 
 
 
 
 
 
 
 

Impact craters on the Moon